is a Japanese professional footballer who plays as a forward or a winger for Vissel Kobe.

Muto started his career with J1 League club FC Tokyo in 2013 who he played with for three seasons. In May 2015, he signed for German club Mainz 05 where he amassed 72 appearances and scored 23 goals before moving to Premier League club Newcastle United in August 2018.

Club career

FC Tokyo
As a child, Muto joined FC Tokyo's youth system, where he kept developing until 2010. He then enrolled in the Faculty of Economics of Keio University but kept playing football, for Keio's team. Despite an injury which sidelined him, in his first season with Keio he won the "Rookie of the Year" title.

In 2012 and 2013, FC Tokyo included him in their roster as a "Special Designated Player", an option that allows J-League clubs to field university players without a professional contract. However, he got on the pitch just once, at the end of a match in July 2013.

In 2014, he signed his first professional contract with FC Tokyo  and was given the shirt number 14. Coach Massimo Ficcadenti decided to use him from the first league round and, at the end of the season, Muto reached 33 appearances and scored 13 goals, matching the top debut record in the Japanese first division. At the end of the season, he was part of the J-League's Best XI.

Muto graduated from Keio University in March 2015, and the following month was subject to a bid by Chelsea. In April, he was elected as March's MVP (Player of the Month) in the J-League.

Mainz 05
On 30 May 2015, Muto joined Bundesliga club Mainz 05 on a four-year contract until 2019. On 31 October 2015, he scored a hat-trick for the first time in his career and also became the second Japanese player after Naohiro Takahara to score a hat-trick in the Bundesliga, in his team's 3–3 draw against FC Augsburg.

Newcastle United
Premier League club Newcastle United announced on 27 July 2018 that they had reached a deal to sign Muto, pending him being granted a UK work permit. He was granted the work permit on 2 August, officially becoming a Newcastle player on a four-year contract as part of a £9.5 million fee. Muto's first goal for Newcastle came in a 3–2 away loss to Manchester United at Old Trafford.

Eibar (loan)
On 16 September 2020, Muto was loaned out to Spanish club Eibar for the 2020–21 season.

Vissel Kobe
On 7 August 2021, Vissel Kobe announced that they signed Muto.

International career
Muto made his debut for Japan on 5 September 2014 in a 2–0 friendly defeat to Uruguay at the Sapporo Dome, replacing Yusuke Minagawa after 58 minutes. Four days later at Yokohama's Nissan Stadium he scored his first international goal, coming on as a half-time substitute against Venezuela and scoring the first goal of a 2–2 draw six minutes later.

As a substitute, Muto played all of Japan's matches at the 2015 AFC Asian Cup in Australia, ending with defeat to the United Arab Emirates in the quarter-finals.

On 31 May 2018, he was named in Japan's final 23-man squad for the 2018 FIFA World Cup in Russia.

On 20 December 2018 he has been called up for the 2019 Asian Cup replacing the injured Takuma Asano.

Career statistics

Club

International

Scores and results list Japan's goal tally first, score column indicates score after each Muto goal.

References

External links

1992 births
Living people
Keio University alumni
People from Setagaya
Japanese footballers
Association football people from Tokyo
Association football forwards
Japan international footballers
2015 AFC Asian Cup players
2018 FIFA World Cup players
2019 AFC Asian Cup players
J1 League players
Bundesliga players
Premier League players
La Liga players
FC Tokyo players
1. FSV Mainz 05 players
Newcastle United F.C. players
SD Eibar footballers
Japanese expatriate footballers
Japanese expatriate sportspeople in Germany
Expatriate footballers in Germany
Japanese expatriate sportspeople in England
Expatriate footballers in England
Japanese expatriate sportspeople in Spain
Expatriate footballers in Spain